is the 12th single by Japanese idol girl group Nogizaka46. It was released on July 22, 2015. It was number-one on the weekly Oricon Singles Chart, reaching a new record for first week sales by the group, with 609,202 copies. It was the best-selling single in Japan in July, with 629,996 copies. As of November 23, 2015 (issue date) it had sold 678,481 copies.  It was also number-one on the Billboard Japan Hot 100. The Japanese television drama series Hatsumori Bemars uses the title song as the theme song.

Release 
This single was released in 5 versions. Type-A, Type-B, Type-C and a regular edition, Seven-Eleven Limited Edition. The center position in the choreography for the title song is held by Rina Ikoma.

Track listing

Regular

Type-A

Type-B

Type-C

Seven-Eleven Limited Edition

Participating members

Taiyou Knock 

3rd Row: Sayuri Matsumura, Yūri Saitō, Minami Hoshino, Asuka Saitō, Marika Itō, Sayuri Inoue, Mai Shinuchi, Misa Etō

2nd Row: Kazumi Takayama, Yumi Wakatsuki, Reika Sakurai, Manatsu Akimoto, Mai Fukagawa

1st Row: Mai Shiraishi, Nanase Nishino, Rina Ikoma, Erika Ikuta, Nanami Hashimoto

Chart and certifications

Weekly charts

Year-end charts

Certifications

References

Further reading

External links
 Discography  on Nogizaka46 Official Website 
 
 Nogizaka46 Movie Digest on YouTube

2015 singles
2015 songs
Japanese-language songs
Nogizaka46 songs
Oricon Weekly number-one singles
Billboard Japan Hot 100 number-one singles
Songs with lyrics by Yasushi Akimoto
Japanese television drama theme songs